The RIT Tigers men's ice hockey team has been in existence since 1959 and a varsity program since 1964, competing in all three divisions of collegiate ice hockey and winning two national championships.  The team has seen seven head coaches, 35 winning varsity seasons, and 14 national tournament appearances.

The team's home rink is the Gene Polisseni Center on the RIT campus in Henrietta, New York. From the 1968-69 season through the 2013-14 season, the Tigers played their home games at the Frank Ritter Memorial Ice Arena on the RIT campus.  Prior to the establishment of the Henrietta campus, the team played at the Ritter-Clark Rink (now the F. Ritter Shumway Arena) on the college's downtown Rochester campus; the first season at Ritter-Clark was 1962–63.  In 1959–60 and 1961–62, the team played at the Rochester War Memorial downtown; in 1960–61, the team played no home games.  Since moving to Henrietta, a handful of home games have been played downtown at the War Memorial (now called the Blue Cross Arena).

Season-by-season results
Note: GP = Games played, W = Wins, L = Losses, T = Ties

* Winning percentage is used when conference schedules are unbalanced.† RIT was ineligible for the postseason in 2007.

Footnotes

References

 
Lists of college men's ice hockey seasons in the United States
RIT Tigers ice hockey seasons